The Saint Mary's Huskies are the men's and women's athletic teams that represent Saint Mary's University in Halifax, Nova Scotia, Canada. Their primary home turf is Huskies Stadium located in the centre of the University's campus.

In September 2007, Saint Mary's announced the plans to build the new Homburg Centre for Health & Wellness that will comprise the current gymnasium (The Tower), the new Dauphinee Arena, and a new building to connect the two.  The centre is to be named after Richard Homburg, who provided a $5 million gift to the project, the largest gift the university had received in its 205-year history.  The Dauphinee Arena, completed in 2019, has an NHL-sized ice surface and a seating capacity for 875.  The arena is named for the late Mr. Bob Dauphinee who was a strong supporter of the Huskies hockey team for over 50 years.  Upon his death in 2001, Mr. Dauphinee had left an estate gift to the university of $2.1 million.

Huskies Basketball

Men's Basketball 
The Huskies have the second-most Atlantic Conference Championships (14),  their last being the 2013-14 season.  Of the AUS conference teams, the Huskies have the most U Sports Championships winning the W. P. McGee Trophy four times in 1973, 1978, 1979 and most recently in 1999.

Saint Mary's University was the host venue for the championship tournament four times in 1965, 1976, 1977 and 1978.  The tournament was hosted in Halifax again for 24 consecutive years; first at Dalhousie University from 1984–1987 and then at the Halifax Metro Centre from 1988-2007.  The tournament returned to the Metro Centre for the 2011 and 2012 Championships.

Women's Basketball 
The women's team are in a tie with the UPEI Panthers for the fifth-most Atlantic Conference Championships (5), their last being the 2015-16 season.  The women competed in their first U Sports Women's Basketball Championship in 2014 and their second in 2015.

Huskies football 

The Huskies football team reached the Vanier Cup eight times between 1988 and 2007, winning in 2001 and 2002. They were the third university to win back-to-back championships, and the first of three universities to appear in at least three consecutive championship tournaments (2001–2003).

Huskies Hockey

Men's Hockey 
The Huskies have the third-most Atlantic Conference Championships (13), their last being the 2009-10 season.  In 2010, the Huskies won their first U Sports University Cup by defeating the Alberta Golden Bears 3-2 in overtime.  This was the Huskies' fifth appearance in the championship final and their first since 1973.

Women's Hockey 

The women's team have the second-most Atlantic Conference Championships (7), and they are the current champions (2017-18 season).  The Huskies have yet to compete in the U Sports Women's Ice Hockey Championship final.

Women's Rugby 
Since rugby became a fully sanctioned Atlantic University Sport in 2002, the Huskies have finished runner up four times (2002, 2007, 2008 and 2009) to the St. Francis Xavier X-Women.

Huskies Soccer

Men's Soccer
The men's team are tied with the Dalhousie Tigers for the second-most Atlantic Conference Championships (13), with their most recent in the 2011 season.  The men reached the U Sports Men's Soccer Championship five times (1979, 1989, 2000, 2003 and 2011) but have yet to win the championship.

Soccer Team Roster

Women's Soccer
The women's team are tied with the St. Francis Xavier X-Women for the fourth-most Atlantic Conference Championships (2), their last title being in 2002.

Women's Volleyball 
The Huskies women's volleyball program is tied with the Moncton Aigles Bleues for the third-most Atlantic Conference Championships (6), with their last being for the 2011-12 season.

References

External links
 

 
U Sports teams
Sports teams in Nova Scotia
Sport in Halifax, Nova Scotia